National Highway 31 (NH 31) previously known National 
Highway 106 a national highway in India. It starts from Birpur in Supaul district to Bihpur in Bhagalpur district and passes through Madhepura district and terminates at Bihpur in Bhagalpur district of Bihar. This National Highway is major Highway of Madhepura district which starts from Birpur passes through Simrahi connects National Highway 57, Singheshwar, Madhepura junction to National Highway 231 previously known National Highway 107, Reshna, Gwalpara, Udakisunganj and terminates at Bihpur connects National Highway 31.

Route
Bihpur, Puraini, Udakishanganj, Reshna Madhepura, Singheswar Sthan, Pipra, Simrahi Bazar, Bhimnagar, Birpur

Junction

  Terminal at Bihpur
  near Madhepura
  near Simrahi Bazar
 Terminate at Birpur

See also 

 List of National Highways in India
 List of National Highways in India by state

References

National highways in India